Victor Guichon was a French racing cyclist. He rode in the 1922 Tour de France.

References

Date of birth unknown
Date of death unknown
French male cyclists
Place of birth missing